Anne-Françoise Bias, known as Fanny Bias ( –  ), was a dancer at the Paris Opera from 1807 to 1825. She was one of the first dancers to use the pointe technique.

Biography 
Bias was born in Paris, France, and trained at the Paris Opera Ballet School under Louis Milon. She made her debut at the opera in 1807 and became one of the most famous dancers of the French Restoration period, together with her friend Émilie Bigottini. Later in her career she became a first soloist at the company.

In 1820 she was a principal in Les Pages du duc de Vendôme by Jean-Pierre Aumer and Adalbert Gyrowetz. She performed in many other productions, including in London.

She retired due to poor health and died in Paris at the age of 36.

References

French female dancers
Paris Opera
1789 births
1825 deaths
19th-century French dancers
Dancers from Paris